Welcome to Kodaikanal is a 1992 Malayalam movie written by Kaloor Dennis and directed by Anil Babu. The movie features Jagadish, Siddique, Anusha, and Sai Kumar in the lead roles. The movie was produced by Hameed under the banner of Gemi Movies and was distributed by Pratheeksha Pictures.

Plot
A man is found dead in a river. The police reveal the flashback about him, James Kutty, who was a music teacher in Kodaikanal and the hardships he faced there.

Cast
 Jagadish as James Kutty
 Siddique as Vinayachandran
 Anusha as Maya
 Sukumari as Elizabeth Samuel
 Sai Kumar as Biju
 Zainuddin as Hussain
 Shweta Menon as Kavitha
 Mala Aravindan as Eradi
 Bobby Kottarakkara as Kunjachan
 KPAC Sunny as Police Officer
 Kanakalatha

Songs
Rajamani gave music to the lines written by Bichu Thirumala.

Song list
 "Pathayoram": M. G. Sreekumar, Minmini
 "Manjukuttikal": M. G. Sreekumar
 "Swayam Marannuvo": M. G. Sreekumar, R. Usha
 "Manjukuttikal": K. S. Chithra
 "Swayam Marannuvo": (Pathos): M. G. Sreekumar

References

External links

1992 films
1990s Malayalam-language films
Films shot in Kodaikanal